Ivane "Vano" Iantbelidze (born on January 14, 1954, in Samtredia, Georgian SSR) is a Soviet and Georgian film, television and stage actor.

Life and career
Vano (Ivane) Iantbelidze born January 14, 1954, in Samtredia, Georgian SSR (then a republic of the Soviet Union).

In 1971, he left secondary school.

Studying at the first year theatrical institute, Vano Iantbelidze debuted in Leonid Bykov's movie One-Two, Soldiers Were Going..., 1973). Further Bykov called Iantbelidze in the following movie "Only Old Men Are Going to Battle., 1976)".

In 1975, Vano Iantbelidze graduated Shota Rustaveli Theatre and Film University and the same year becomes the actor of Telavi state drama theater on which scene he played more than 150 roles. Because of high employment on a theatrical scene further, the actor seldom appeared at cinema.

Selected filmography
 1973 — One-Two, Soldiers Were Going... as Vano Koderidze, "the hero without tiger skin"
 1975 — Eleven hopes as Bregvadze
 1976 — Only Old Men Are Going to Battle as Vano Kobakhidze, fighter pilot
 1982 — The Sad Horn an episode
 1984 — Snow over white gardens an episode
 1992 — Paradise Under The Shade of Swords as Hasaykhan Utsmiyev, the officer of the Russian army
 1995 — Resettlers
 2006 — Two Khevsurians (short) as Papakho Khan, old Khevsur
 2015 — The Guard (Гвардія), Ukrainian mini-series as Guram Levidze, the owner of restaurant

References

External links
 
 Ivane Iantbelidze Filmography
 Vano Iantbelidze
 Vano Iantbelidze on Facebook

1954 births
Living people
Actors from Tbilisi
20th-century male actors from Georgia (country)
Male film actors from Georgia (country)
Ukrainian male film actors
Russian male film actors
People's Artists of Georgia
21st-century male actors from Georgia (country)
Male stage actors from Georgia (country)
Male television actors from Georgia (country)